Jack Arkinstall (May 1920 in Australia – 1976) was an Australian tennis player.

Arkinstall came from a poor family, however his father laid a private tennis court on the property of the family farm. He was asked in 1959 by tennis promoter Jack Kramer to become a professional tennis player. He was about the same age as two other Australian players, Bill Sidwell and Dinny Pails.

Amateur 
Arkinstall had a lengthy amateur tennis player, and traveled the world. He won numerous matches and international tennis tournaments, however never reached the top of his country. At Wimbledon, he reached the fourth round in 1953 when he was in the fifth set against in his compatriot Ken Rosewall, whom he had lost against previously. At Wimbledon in 1954 Arkinstall lost in the first round against the eventual champion, Yugoslav Jaroslav Drobny. He competed again in 1955 at Wimbledon, this time reaching the third round to fall against Drobny. At Wimbledon in 1956, Arkinstall lost to the eventual semifinalist, American Ham Richardson. In his last appearance at Wimbledon 1957, he lost in the first round in a large defeat against the Brit Mike Davies.

He never won the Australian Open Championships or any other Grand Slam tournament. Once he played against Rosewall in his professional career and lost narrowly in the final, fifth set. Arkinstall broke through late into international tennis. In 1950, when he was thirty years old, he played his first international tennis tournament. In 1954, Arkinstall won in the final against the number one player from India Ramanathan Krishnan. He won the Yugoslavian Championships that year against the number one Yugoslav Jaroslav Drobny. In 1954 he won the All India Hard Court Championships in Madras, and again in 1956. In an indoor tournament India Krishnan revenged himself by winning the final against Arkinstall. In 1956 Arkinstall played the Nation Cup for his country - he lost the men's doubles match with Lew Hoad against his Italian opponents Guiseppo Merlo and Orlando Sirola (numbers two).

Professional career 
In 1958, he played as a professional in his debut at the Wembley Championships in London when he lost the first round of his compatriot Frank Sedgman. The year after Arkinstall played back on Wembley Championships and he again lost against compatriot Ashley Cooper. At the French Pro Championship in 1959 Arkinstall was defeated in the fourth round and repeated that at the tournament in 1960. In 1960, Arkinstall played at the  Wembley Pro and again lost in the first round, this time against the Spaniard Andrés Gimeno, the Spanish number one. In 1962, he competed as a pro in the US Pro Championships reaching the quarterfinal against Earl Buchholz. That was his last year in professional tennis.

Retirement 
After his active career as a tennis pro was Jack Arkinstall coach of the young Manuel Santana from Spain. He was the number five of Australia in the time he Frank Sedgman (1), Ken McGregor (2), Mervyn Rose (3) and Dinny Pails (4) had, but was higher than his countrymen Geoffrey Brown ('24) Bill Sidwell ('20), Bob Howe ('25) Rex Hartwig ('29), Ian Ayre ('29), George Worthington ('28) and Don Tregonning ('29); before the next generation of Australian tennis players in picture came with, among others, Ken Rosewall. Jack Arkinstall wrote in 1967 a book titled The Arkinstall Tennis Rhythm Method. He died at the age of 56 of a heart attack.

Arkinstall Park
In memory of the Arkinstall family, a sports centre , Arkinstall Park, exists at Tweed Heads, Australia. Upgrades to the park's existing facilities were announced in 2013. The park includes netball courts and clubhouse, tennis courts and clubhouse, BBQ area and playground.

Note: Arkinstall park in Hefron St South Tweed Heads was actually named after Jack's younger brother, Neville, who was a talented sportsman in his own right being accomplished as a hockey and cricket player as well as tennis.

References

1920 births
1976 deaths
Professional tennis players before the Open Era
Australian male tennis players
Place of birth missing